The Romania women's national volleyball team is governed by the Federaţia Română de Volei and takes part in international volleyball competitions.

Results

European Championship
 1949 — 4th place
 1950 — 5th place
 1951 — did not qualify
 1955 — 4th place
 1958 — 4th place
 1963 —  Bronze Medal
 1967 — 9th place'
 1971 — 7th place'
 1975 — 7th place'
 1977 — 6th place'
 1977 — 5th place'
 1981 — 7th place'
 1983 — 6th place'
 1985 — 11th place
 1987 — 8th place
 1989 — 4th place
 1991 — 6th place
 1993 — 10th place
 1995 — did not qualify
 1997 — 12th place
 1999 — 6th place
 2001 — 7th place
 2003 — 8th place'
 2005 — 10th place
 2007 — did not qualify
 2009 — did not qualify
 2011 — 12th place
 2013 — did not qualify
 2015 — 15th place
 2017 — did not qualify
 2019 — 13th place
 2021 — 23rd place
 2023 — qualified

Current squad  
The squad chosen for the 2021 European Championship.

Head coach:  Luciano Pedullà
 1  Diana Ariton 
 3  Rodica Buterez 
 4  Diana Balintoni 
 7  Petruța Orlandea   
 10  Denisa Ioana Ionescu 
 11  Maria Matei 
 12  Sorina Miclăuș 
 13  Alexandru Ciucu 
 14  Alexia Căruțașu 
 15  Marina Cojocaru 
 16  Andra Cojocaru 
 19  Adelina Budai-Ungureanu 
 20  Georgiana Popa 
 23  Roxana Roman

Notable players
Carmen Țurlea
Cristina Pîrv
Alida Cioroianu-Marcovici
Mirela Corjeuţanu 
Anca Popescu  
Luminița Pintea-Trombițaș   
Elena Butnaru 
Nicoleta Țolișteanu-Manu  
Florentina Nedelcu
Iuliana Roxana Nucu
Adina Salaoru
Nneka Onyejekwe
Ioana Baciu
Alina Albu
Ioana Nemțanu 
Roxana Bacșiș
Diana Calotă
Andreea Constantinescu

See also
Romania men's national volleyball team

References

External links
Official website
FIVB profile
CEV profile

National women's volleyball teams
Volleyball in Romania
Women's national sports teams of Romania